Zoogocho Zapotec, or Diža'xon, is a Zapotec language of Oaxaca, Mexico.

It is spoken in San Bartolomé Zoogocho, Oaxaca, Santa María Yalina, Tabehua, and Oaxaca City.

As of 2013, about 1,500 "Zoogochenses" live in Los Angeles, California. Classes are held in the MacArthur Park neighborhood to preserve the Zoogocho Zapotec language.

The language is also known as Tabehua, Yalina, Zapoteco de San Bartolomé Zoogocho, and Zoogocho.

Phonology

Vowels 

There are a total of five vowels in  San Bartolomé Zoogocho Zapotec. The /u/ sound is used in loanwords. Phonation types include: VV, VhV, V'. VV stands for double vowels that produce a creaky voice, vowels which include an h in between them produce a breathy sounds such as in the word yáhà, and vowels such as V' are checked vowels.

Tones 
Tones include high, mid, low, rising and falling.  Lower tonal qualities are seen more commonly in breathy tones, while checked vowels have a higher tone quality.  Although it's common for breathy to have a lower tones and checked vowels commonly have higher tones, this is considered a distinct phenomenon and tone can't be predicted based on phonation types. 

Example: yáhà 'weapon’

Stress 
In Zoogocho Zapotec, stress is most commonly found on the penultimate syllable of a stem.  Stress is not found in words that are made of more than one root, in this situation, the stress(accent) will fall on the second root. 

Example: Niihe 'nixtamal'; Yeten 'the tortilla 

 Syllable Structure 
(C)CV(V)(C)(C), there are no restrictions on phonation type on the vowels in this type of syllable set up. 
 Consonants 

A few sounds also occur in loanwords from Spanish: /f/, /ɾ/, /ɲ/, /x/, /r/, /ɲ/, and /x/. 

 Morphology 

 Nominal Morphology 

Nominal means to be categorized in a group of nouns and adjectives, the morphology occurs in a noun phrase.   

 Possession 
Possession is indicated by placing the possessor or possessive pronoun after the item possessed (Inherent possession is the items being possessed) which is marked prenominally with prefix x- , the possessed nominal then is developed by a pronominal clitic or noun phrase.  

 Pronominal Clitic 
Or noun phrase is pronounced like an affix. Clitics play a syntactic role at the phrase level. 

 Verbal Morphology 
No tense in this language. Zoogocho Zapotec relies on 'temporal particles' za, ba, na, gxe, or neghe. 

 Primary Aspect 
Events that are still occurring, occurred, or will occur over a period of time. The continuative aspect of the examples is dx- .

The completive aspect is usually marked as b-, gw-, gud-, or g-. This aspect reflects the completion of the event occurred.

The potential aspect refers to an event that has not yet happened or an event that has not been specified. This aspect is marked by gu- or gw-.

The stative aspect''' is referred to as the prefix n- or by nothing at all. This aspect has multiple uses, such as, expressing the states and conditions and habitual meaning.

 Orthography 

 Dillawalhall Zapotec Alphabet 
a, b, ch, chh, d, e, f, g, i, j, k, l, ll, lh, m, n, nh, o, p, r, rh, s, sh, t, u, w, x, xh, y, z. 

 Vowels 

 Consonants 

  

 Syntax 

 Sentence Structure 
Zoogocho Zapotec uses Verb Subject Object sentence structure. It is possible to use Object Verb Subject, and Subject Verb Object but they only occur in special situations. 

 Noun Phrases 
Adjective-Noun Order: The ordering of adjectives and nouns.

When asked to cite adjectives in isolations native speakers will invariably put da the inanimate classifier in front of the adjective.Da is used as an inanimate classifier, bi is a classifier for small things and be is an animate classifier. These three classifiers can be used in sentences when agreeing with the head noun. The reason behind the conditioning for this remains undetermined.

 Plural Markers 
Not always present in plural noun phrases, and plurality is either recovered from context or from verbal marking. Ka'' is used to mark a plural noun

Demonstratives 
Demonstratives follow their nouns, and either appear by themselves as in or with a classifier as in.

Determiners 
Determiners occur at the end of a noun phrase.

References

External links 
 Long C., Rebecca & Sofronio Cruz M., compilers. 1999. Diccionario Zapoteco de San Bartolomé Zoogocho Oaxaca. Coyoacán D.F.: Instituto Lingüístico de Verano.
Zoogocho Zapotec language resources
OLAC resources in and about the Zoogocho Zapotec language

Zapotec languages